Hemley is a village and a civil parish in the East Suffolk district, in the English county of Suffolk.

It is located near the River Deben. Nearby settlements include the large town of Ipswich and the villages of Waldringfield and Newbourne. In 2001 the population of the civil parish of Hemley was 66. At the 2011 Census the population of the village remained less than 100 and was included in the civil parish of Newbourne

All Saints' parish church dates from the 14th century and is a Grade II* listed building.

References 

http://www.genuki.org.uk/big/eng/SFK/Hemley/index.html

External links 
 http://www.britishlistedbuildings.co.uk/england/suffolk/hemley
 https://www.geograph.org.uk/gridref/TM2842

Villages in Suffolk
Civil parishes in Suffolk
Suffolk Coastal